S.I.V.E.T College, is a general degree college located at Velachery Main Road in Tambaram, Chennai, Tamil Nadu. It was established in the year 1966. The college is affiliated with University of Madras. This college offers different courses in arts, commerce and science.

Departments

Science
Physics
Chemistry
Mathematics
Computer Science
Biochemistry
Zoology
Visual Communication

Arts and Commerce

History
Economics
Commerce
Corporate Secretaryship
Accounts And Finance
Computer Application
Business Administration

Accreditation
The college is  recognized by the University Grants Commission (UGC).

References

External links

Educational institutions established in 1966
1966 establishments in Madras State
Colleges affiliated to University of Madras
Universities and colleges in Chennai